Dobson's horseshoe bat (Rhinolophus yunanensis) is a species of bat in the family Rhinolophidae. It is found in China, India, Myanmar, and Thailand.

References

Rhinolophidae
Bats of Asia
Bats of Southeast Asia
Mammals of China
Mammals of India
Mammals of Vietnam
Taxa named by George Edward Dobson
Mammals described in 1872
Taxonomy articles created by Polbot